I'm Your Man is a 2021 German science fiction romance film written and directed by Maria Schrader and starring Maren Eggert, Dan Stevens and Sandra Hüller. It premiered at the 71st Berlin International Film Festival in March 2021. It was selected as the German entry for the Best International Feature Film at the 94th Academy Awards.

Plot
Dr. Alma Felser, an archeologist, arrives at a dance club where an employee introduces her to Tom. Alma quizzes Tom with a complex math problem and on trivial details about his favorite poem, and he answers readily. Tom then invites Alma to dance but suddenly begins repeating himself; he is quickly carried away, revealing him to be a robot.

The employee apologizes, noting that Alma is one of only 10 experts asked to evaluate their robots, reassuring her that they will fix the glitch and she can proceed with the three-week project the next day. 

Alma then visits Roger, her department head at the Pergamon Museum, ridiculing the many tests she went through to be presented with her "ideal man", mocking Tom and saying she's ready to write her evaluation. Roger reminds Alma that she agreed to the 3-week assessment and that he needs her expert input, as he is on an ethics committee that will decide if the robots will be given some human rights. Roger tells Alma that if she goes through with the experiment, he will allocate funds for her and her team to visit Chicago to see certain cuneiform tablets in person. 

Afterwards, fellow museum worker (and former fiancee) Julian invites Alma to his housewarming party, to meet his new girlfriend Steffi.  There, Alma realizes that Steffi is pregnant, which perturbs her because (as the audience will find out later), she became pregnant with Julian, but then had a miscarriage.

Alma visits her father, an elderly man showing signs of memory loss. She later takes Tom home and, over the next few days, resists his romantic gestures. Julian arrives at the apartment one morning to collect a painting, indicating that he and Alma were once in a relationship.

Alma then brings Tom with her to the museum. Tom is introduced to her team's work and suddenly alerts Alma of another researcher who has already written a paper about the subject they're researching. Alma reacts angrily and later gets drunk. At her apartment, Alma confronts Tom about whether or not he can feel anger, and questions how he is programmed to respond sexually. Rather than getting sexual, Tom puts Alma in her bed and leaves her there, saying she needs sleep.

The next day, the employee arrives for an evaluation. Alma says Tom's programming is "good" but gets irritated when the employee challenges her for treating Tom like a machine. Alma then realizes that the employee is also a robot and orders her out of her apartment. She apologizes to Tom for her behavior the night before.

Alma takes Tom to visit her father. She and her sister, Cora, review old photos and remember a childhood friend named Tom whom they met in Denmark, and with whom they were both in love. Tom and Alma then go to Julian's housewarming party. Steffi faints and Tom prevents her from hitting the ground. Alma talks to Julian privately, asking if Steffi is pregnant, which he confirms.

Back at her apartment, it’s revealed that Alma had previously suffered a miscarriage. Tom realizes Alma's fears of growing old alone like her father and Alma leaves the apartment, upset. She spies Tom coming out of the building, calling her name and looking for her. Alma follows him to the museum where they both sneak in, and they have sex in the shadows.

The next morning, Alma says she cannot continue with the charade of interacting with a machine and that she is going to stop the experiment early. When Tom repeatedly asks what will become of him, Alma says she cannot send him away and that she needs him to do it for her. Tom then leaves.

Alma records her evaluation for Roger, noting that having your every need fulfilled is not healthy for humans. She is then visited by the employee for another evaluation and realizes that Tom did not go back to the factory as she assumed, and he is now missing. Alma then takes the ferry to Denmark and finds Tom sitting in the spot where she had met her childhood friend, having waited three days for her. Alma tells the story of how she used to sit in that same spot with her eyes closed, imagining the child Tom next to her, but whenever she opened her eyes he was never there. She closes her eyes.

Cast
The cast includes:
 Maren Eggert as Alma Felser
 Dan Stevens as Tom
 Sandra Hüller as Employee
 Hans Löw as Julian
 Wolfgang Hübsch as Father Felser
 Annika Meier as Cora
 Falilou Seck as Dekan Roger
 Jürgen Tarrach as Dr. Stuber
 Karolin Oesterling as Chloé
 Henriette Richter-Röhl as Steffi
 Monika Oschek as Woman in Coffee Shop

Release
On February 11, 2021, Berlinale announced that the film would premiere at the 71st Berlin International Film Festival, in the Berlinale Competition section, in March 2021. Shortly after, Bleecker Street acquired U.S. distribution rights. It was released in the U.S. on September 17, 2021.

Reception

Critical response
Review aggregator Rotten Tomatoes gives the film a 96% approval rating based on 122 reviews, with an average rating of 7.60/10. The site's critical consensus reads: "With a thought-provoking concept brought to humorous life by a pair of well-matched leads, I'm Your Man is an AI rom-com whose intelligence is anything but artificial." On Metacritic, the film has a score of 78 out of 100, based on 26 critics, indicating "Generally favorable reviews."

Accolades

See also
 List of submissions to the 94th Academy Awards for Best International Feature Film
 List of German submissions for the Academy Award for Best International Feature Film

References

External links
 

2021 science fiction films
German drama films
2020s German-language films